Bharati Vidyapeeth Deemed University College of Engineering, Pune is an engineering and technology oriented institute of higher education established in 1983. It is the constituent college of Bharati Vidyapeeth.

History
Bharati Vidyapeeth Deemed University College of Engineering, Pune, India under Bharati Vidyapeeth Deemed University was established by Dr. Patangrao Kadam in September 1983. The college became a constituent unit of Bharati Vidyapeeth Deemed University in June 2000 and was thereafter accessed and accredited to grade "A" by NAAC further, all of its programmes are also accredited by NBA.

Campus

The college has the following facilities:

The college houses 101 laboratories, 43 classrooms and 21 tutorial rooms, a five-storied library with more than 69,000 books, 19,000 volumes 72 national and 70 international journal subscriptions and digital library facility, computer centre, auditorium, seminar halls, audio-video halls, playground, gymnasium, cafeteria, general store, bank and hostels for boys and girl on the campus.

Academics
Bharati Vidyapeeth Deemed University College of Engineering, Pune offers Doctor of Philosophy (PhD), Master of Technology (MTech.), Bachelor of Science and Bachelor of Technology (BTech.) degrees in various specializations.

The college organises Skill Development Programmes and Expert Talks to help students get a better knowledge of the corporate functioning.

Research is being conducted in various fields of Technologies and Expertise in Artificial Intelligence is one of the key features.

Admission
 Admission to B.Tech is via Bharati Vidyapeeth's own Common Entrance Test BVPCET (engineering), 70% seats are available through the entrance tests and Rest are through JEE, MHTCET, Management Quota.
 Admission to M.Tech is via Common Entrance Test BVPCET held every year during the month of May/Jun.

Rankings

The Bharati Vidyapeeth Deemed University College of Engineering, Pune was ranked 133 in India by the National Institutional Ranking Framework (NIRF) engineering ranking for 2022.

References 

Engineering colleges in Pune